The 2020 Latvian First League (referred to as the Komanda.lv First League for sponsorship reasons) is the 29th season of second-tier football in Latvia. The season started on 4 July 2020. 

On November 6, 2020, the Latvian Football Federation determined the suspension of the championship due to COVID-19, so the final positions were assigned with a coefficient marked with the results obtained up to the last week played.

Teams

Note: Table lists in alphabetical order.

League table
</noinclude>
<noinclude>

Results
Each club will play each other twice (home and away) in the first half of the season, and then play each other once (either home or away) in the second half of the season for a total of 24 matches per team.

References

External links 
 The First League on the Latvian Football Federation website

Latvian First League seasons
2
Latvia
Latvia